Ben Rutledge (born November 9, 1980, in Cranbrook, British Columbia) was a Canadian Olympic rower and is currently a Mortgage Broker.

In Seville, Spain 2002 he was a member of Canada's inaugural Men's 8+ crew to win a gold medal at a World Championship regatta.  He accomplished this task two more times in 2003 and 2007 in Milan, Italy, and Munich, Germany.

His Olympic results include a disappointing fifth-place finish in the men's 8+ at the 2004 Athens Olympics. However, after a hard-fought 4-year comeback, Ben and his teammates Andrew Byrnes, Kyle Hamilton, Malcolm Howard, Adam Kreek, Kevin Light, Dominic Sieterle, Jake Wetzel and cox Brian Price won a gold medal at the 2008 Summer Olympics in Beijing, China.

In 2006 he was the recipient of the Bobby Gaul Memorial Trophy an award presented by the University of British Columbia to the graduating male athlete who best combines the qualities of leadership and sportsmanship.

In 2006 he combined with former Canada National Team rower Robert Weitemeyer as well as varsity athletes Stephane Gervais, Robert Miller and Kevin Johns to capture the overall Men's Championship for Storm the Wall, a relay race held annually at the University of British Columbia, widely considered as the largest intramural event in North America.

Education 
Ben attended Mount Baker Secondary School located in Cranbrook, B.C.

Rutledge graduated from the Sauder School of Business in University of British Columbia with a Bachelor of Commerce, specializing in Real Estate and Marketing in 2006.

References

 UBC Thunderbirds

External links
 
 Rowing Canada Bio's
 

1980 births
Sportspeople from Cranbrook, British Columbia
Living people
Olympic rowers of Canada
Olympic gold medalists for Canada
Rowers at the 2004 Summer Olympics
Rowers at the 2008 Summer Olympics
Canadian male rowers
UBC Sauder School of Business alumni
Olympic medalists in rowing
Medalists at the 2008 Summer Olympics
World Rowing Championships medalists for Canada